Gorzów Wielkopolski often abbreviated to Gorzów Wlkp. or simply Gorzów, is a city in western Poland, on the Warta river. It is the second largest city in the Lubusz Voivodeship with 120,087 inhabitants and one of its two capitals with a seat of a voivode, with the other being Zielona Góra.

Around Gorzów, there are two large forest areas: Gorzów Woods to the north, where the Barlinek-Gorzów Landscape Park is situated, and Noteć Woods to the southeast. The biggest oil fields in Poland are located near Gorzów.

Etymology
The pre-1945 German name Landsberg an der Warthe, dating back to 1257, derived from the German words land or 'state' and berg or 'mountain' combined with Warthethe German name for the river Warta.

The Polish name Gorzów, written as Gorzew, is known from Polish maps and historical books dating back to the 19th century or perhaps earlier. The name appeared in a compendium called Ancient Poland according to its history, geography and statistics published in 1848 by Samuel Orgelbrand in Warsaw. Ten years earlier, in 1838, the same name Gorzew was used in a book published in Paris with a corresponding yet broader title encompassing all of Poland.

The current spelling of "Gorzów" appears on the map featuring "Królestwo Polskie" published in Lviv in 1900 with "Landsberg an der Warthe" in parenthesis next to "Gorzów". The name is interpreted in several different ways according to rules of the Old Polish language, originating from "gorzenie" (fire, burning) or "pogorzelcy" (survivors of a fire), or alternatively "gorzelnia" (distillery) or "gorzałka" (spirits).

In Polish, it was the name 'Gorzów' which eventually stuck, beating the alternative postwar name "Kobylagóra", or 'Mare Mountain', which survives today as the name of a street in the city. The word Wielkopolski means "Greater Polish", after the voivodeship of that name of which Gorzów was a part from 1946 to 1950, was added later. The area of today's Gorzów was part of the historical region of Greater Poland until the mid-13th century.

History

During the reign of the first Polish monarchs of the Piast dynasty there was a craft and trade settlement and until the mid-13th century, the land where the river Kłodawka meets the Warta was the location of a defensive fort established by the Polish Piast dynasty. In 1249 the Silesian Duke Bolesław II Rogatka had sold Lubusz Land in the west to the Ascanian Margraves of Brandenburg, and the city of Landisberch Nova (named after Altlandsberg) was founded on the site in 1257. The city was at that time an eastern outpost of the newly established Neumark region of Brandenburg, close to the Greater Polish fortress of Santok. After a war broke out over control of the region in 1319, the town came under control of the Duchy of Pomerania, but by 1325 it fell to Brandenburg again. In 1325 Polish, in 1432 Hussite troops beleaguered the city. In 1373 the city became part of the Lands of the Bohemian Crown (or Czech Lands), ruled by the Luxembourg dynasty. In 1402, the Luxembourgs reached an agreement with Poland in Kraków. Poland was to buy and re-incorporate Gorzów and the surrounding region, but eventually the Luxembourgs sold the city to the Teutonic Order. In 1454, after the Thirteen Years’ War broke out, the Teutonic Knights sold the city to Brandenburg in order to raise funds for war against Poland. In the 16th century the city became Lutheran, with St. Mary's Cathedral changing its allegiance in 1537.

In 1701 Landsberg (Gorzów) became part of the Kingdom of Prussia. On 4 February 1813 during the Napoleonic Wars the Russian Ataman Aleksandr Chernichev and his Cossack troops defeated a French battalion of 1,500 men of Louis-Nicolas Davout's corps. In 1815 – in the course of an administrative restructuring – the town became part of Prussia's Province of Brandenburg. One of the main escape routes for surviving insurgents of the Polish November Uprising from partitioned Poland to the Great Emigration led through the city. The city, like all of Prussia, was included in the German Empire in 1871 during the unification of Germany.

During World War II, the Germans established nine forced labour camps, as well as four labour units for French, Italian and Soviet prisoners of war in the city.

In early 1945 during World War II the town was heavily damaged following the retreat of the Wehrmacht ahead of the Soviet Red Army. The Red Army arrived in the city on 30 January 1945, approaching from the left bank of the river Warta. The Wehrmacht had already evacuated most of the city, and the advancing forces met very little resistance. Over the course of the next few days, most of the city centre was destroyed, reportedly through the accidental spread of a fire started in order to light the westward march of the Red Army.

The city became part of Poland in accordance with border changes promulgated at the postwar Potsdam Conference, supposedly pending a final peace conference with Germany. Since a peace conference never took place, the town was effectively ceded to Poland. German residents who had not fled or died in the war were expelled in accordance to the Potsdam Agreement, and the city was gradually repopulated with Polish settlers from central Poland and those expelled from Polish territory annexed by the Soviet Union. The last original German inhabitants were forced to leave the city in the early 1950s. It was at this time that Gorzów's now sizeable Tatar and Romani communities arrived in the town. Not having had an agreed Polish name, the town was initially renamed as "Kobylagóra" on 30 May 1945, later as "Gorzów nad Wartą" on 7 July 1945 and finally "Gorzów Wielkopolski" on 5 November 1946.

Between 1975 and 1998, it was the capital of the Gorzów Voivodeship.

Climate
Gorzów Wielkopolski has an oceanic climate  (Köppen climate classification: Cfb) using the  isotherm or a humid continental climate (Köppen climate classification: Dfb) using the  isotherm.

Main attractions
Although the centre of Gorzów was heavily damaged during the Second World War, there are still many notable tourist attractions in the city. The largest of these is the Gothic, red-brick Gorzów Cathedral of the Virgin Mary, dating from the end of the 13th century, situated on the old market square. The city centre is overwhelmingly occupied by Communist-era buildings, although many have been beautified, most notably those around the old market square. Many of the façades of the buildings in the centre were renovated in anticipation of the visit of Pope John Paul II to Gorzów in 1997.
Due to the large number of parks and green spaces, Gorzów has been termed 'the city of parks and gardens'. In addition to the central Park of Roses, there is also a viewing area on the hilltop of Siemiradzki Park which commands impressive views across the plains and woods to the south of the city.

The city also contains the museum of Lubusz Voivodeship, which is divided between two sites. The Spichlerz or 'granary' dates from the 18th century and can be found on the left bank of the Warta. The museum, housed inside, frequently plays host to art exhibitions and has a permanent collection of artifacts and photographs relating to the history of the city. The other part of the museum, on Warszawska street, is housed in the secessionist villa of Gustav Schroeder. This section contains a wide range of artifacts, ranging from portraits of the 17th century, to weapons, pottery, and the Biedermeier interior furnishings of the villa itself.

The Old Town was almost completely destroyed, but the New Town (19th century) has survived in good condition as a complex of hundreds of buildings and is in the Heritage Register. For the past few years, historical tenements have been successfully undergoing renovation.

The Jewish cemetery of Gorzów is on the western edge of the city. The cemetery was vandalised in the 1930s, but a number of graves still remain intact.

Politics
In recent years Gorzów Wielkopolski has been known for former Prime Minister Kazimierz Marcinkiewicz, who was born and worked here. After stepping down as the PM he was appointed as acting mayor of Warsaw and then as a counsel to a chairman of PKO BP bank. In 2007 he became one of the directors of the European Bank for Reconstruction and Development. He now works for Goldman Sachs.

Economy

Gorzów is an economic centre of the region with almost 18,000 registered businesses (2008), the unemployment rate is 7.6% (December 2009). The City of Gorzów has received an air Play Commune-Certified Investment Location award in big cities classification. The city has a good shopping and services infrastructure. There are numerous petrol stations, branches of all major banks and insurance companies as well as car dealers.

Major shopping malls in the city are Nova Park, Galeria Askana, Panorama, Park 111, there is one Tesco hypermarket and many discount and department stores and retailers.

Landsberg an der Warthe before the World War II was a very well developed and industrialized city. The most notable entrepreneurs included industrialists Max Bahr and Herman Paucksch. After the war and Red Army liberation, the city suffered from heavy losses especially in machinery which was confiscated by the Soviets.

In the postwar time Gorzów saw a fast economic development and new industries were founded like  Stilon (chemical fibres), Silwana (fabrics) and Ursus (tractors) who remained major employers up to the mid-1990s. After Leszek Balcerowicz's free market reforms former state-owned companies either went bankrupt or had severe financial problems that resulted in radical employment and production reduction. In the 1990s and 2000s the city saw a new economic age. While public giants were collapsing new private companies were established. Currently the biggest employer in the city is Sumitomo Electric Bordnetze Sp. z o.o. (previously Volkswagen Elektro-Systemy Sp. z o.o.), car wiring systems. The then German company established in Gorzów in 1993 (taken over by Japanese Sumitomo Electric in 2006), it operates in Stilon industrial estate. Gorzów Heat and Power Plant (Elektrociepłownia Gorzów) is a modern company with over 300 staff and it holds an award of Fair Play Company. One of the most distinguished employers is Biowet Vetoquinol which has over 100 years of experience in veterinary medicines and chemistry. manufacturing. Gorzów is a Polish headquarters of Spartherm Feuerungstechnik GmbH.

A recent economic development of the city was boosted by creation of Kostrzyn-Słubice Special Economic Zone and its Subzone Gorzów. At present there are two significant employers in the Subzone: Faurecia and TPV Displays and many other smaller companies operating there.

Transport

Gorzów has a good public transport network. City Transport Company (MZK) which is in charge of transport services runs 27 daily bus lines, four night lines, and three tram lines. In the summer season there are services to nearby lakes. MZK services carry about 90,000 people every day. The company owns one of the most modern bus fleets in Poland.

There are railway connections with major Polish cities, mostly with interchange in Krzyż or Kostrzyn. There are plans to start fast through trains to Poznań, Szczecin, Wrocław and Berlin. Gorzów main station was renovated in 2009 and 2010 and it offers bed and breakfast, restaurant and retail services.

The S3 expressway provides a fast road connection to Szczecin and Zielona Góra.

Culture

Gorzów is well known for the International Romani Gathering Romane Dyvesa which is held every summer in the first week of July. The gathering includes a series of concerts held in the outdoor amphitheatre near the centre of the city. The festival is organised by Edward Dębicki, the founder of the Romani music group Terno, which also performs as part of the series of concerts.

Romane Dyvesa continues Gorzów's strong tradition of Romani culture, of which the most widely known member was the poet Bronisława Wajs, often known as Papusza. Wajs's former home on Kosynierów Gdyńskich street is marked with a plaque, as is the main city library on Sikorskiego street. The library itself holds a collection of books about Papusza, as well as the manuscripts of her correspondence with Julian Tuwim. In Poland the city is famous for its Jazz Club Pod Filarami which every autumn organizes  Gorzów Jazz Celebrations a festival which hosts internationally recognized musicians from Poland and around the world.

Religion
The city is predominantly Roman-Catholic, with an Eastern Orthodox church, an Old Catholic (Polish Catholic) congregation and a number of Protestant (Baptist, Pentecostal/neo-Pentecostal, Lutheran) as well as the (Restorationist, non-mainstream Protestant) Jehovah's Witnesses congregations present there. It is home to the house general of the Congregation of Sisters of Merciful Jesus. Its first monastery is in nearby Myślibórz.

Infrastructure
There are several hotels including railway station bed and breakfast.

The city offers leisure facilities. Sports and Rehabilitation Centre "Słowianka" offers 50 m Olympic pool, aqua park facilities, saunas, gym, massage and spa. Gracja hotel offers a 25 m pool. There are a few gyms and sports hall in the city. New rowing centre at the Warta river has been completed in 2009. Speedway stadium is undergoing major extension works this year.

Gorzów embankment, which is undergoing major renovation in 2011, is a new nightlife centre. There are many restaurants and pubs around the embankment and others are coming soon.

Education

 
 Poznan University School of Physical Education - Faculty of Physical Education in Gorzów Wielkopolski
 Wyzsza Szkola Biznesu w Gorzowie Wlkp.
 Poznan University of Medical Sciences - University Teaching Center in Gorzów Wielkopolski

Sports

Gorzów is famous in Poland for its great clubs and fine athletes. There are two Olympic champions from Gorzów: Tomasz Kucharski and Michał Jeliński, both in rowing. It is a home for many world champions and Olympic medalists.

A historical sport is also volleyball. GTPS holds to a great tradition and has had many outstanding players with the best ever, Sebastian Świderski, born in Gorzów. 
AZS AJP Gorzów Wielkopolski – women basketball team, competing in the Basket Liga Kobiet (top division; as of 2021–22)
Stal Gorzów Wielkopolski – motorcycle speedway team, competing in the Speedway Ekstraliga (top division; as of 2022), nine times Polish Champions
Stilon Gorzów Wielkopolski – football club with men and women sections
 - football club with men and women sections
Gorzów is a national powerhouse in water polo for decades. International events are regularly held at the Slowianka Sports Centre with a modern Olympic-size pool.

Notable people

Gottfried Bernhardy (1800–1875), philologist and literary historian
Hermann Paucksch (1816-1899), German mechanical engineering contractor and manufacturer
Hermann Ende (1829–1907), German architect
Max Fränkel (1846–1903), German classical scholar, philologist, epigrapher and librarian
Arthur Moritz Schönflies (1853–1928), German mathematician
Ludwig Pick (1868–1944), German pathologist
Georg Axhausen (1877–1960), oral and maxillofacial surgeon
Marie Juchacz (1879–1956), German SPD politician
Victor Klemperer (1881–1960), author and literary scholar
Ernst Schwarz (1886–1958), German politician
Elisabeth Röhl (1888–1930), German politician
Kurt Scharf (1902–1990), Lutheran bishop of Berlin
Bronisława Wajs (1908–1987), Romani poet
Herman Bottcher (1909–1944), German-born American soldier
Roger G. Newton (1924–2018), German-born American physicist
Christa Wolf (1929–2011), writer and literary critic
Teresa Klimek (1929–2013), math teacher, co-founder of the local branch of the Catholic Intellectuals Club and executive on the regional branch of Solidarity
Wolfgang Müller (1931-2021), German equestrian
Edward Dębicki (born 1935), Romani poet, composer and musician
Edward Jancarz (1946–1992), speedway rider
Danuta Danielsson (1947–1988), Polish anti-Nazi protester, subject of an iconinc photograph taken in 1985 in Växjö, Sweden
Zenon Plech (born 1953), speedway rider
Kazimierz Marcinkiewicz (born 1959), former Prime Minister of Poland
Marek Jurek (born 1960), politician, former Marshal of the Sejm of the Republic of Poland
Lech Piasecki (born 1961), racing cyclist
Zenon Jaskuła (born 1962), racing cyclist
Tomasz Kucharski (born 1974), rower, double Olympic champion
Beata Sokołowska-Kulesza (born 1974), sprint canoer, olympic bronze medalist and world champion
Sebastian Świderski (born 1977), volleyball player
Michał Jeliński (born 1980), olympic and four times world champion in rowing
Michal (Michał Kwiatkowski, born 1983), singer, Star Academy music contest runner-up
Łukasz Maliszewski (born 1985), footballer
Kamil Dragun (born 1995), chess grandmaster
Dawid Kwiatkowski (born 1996), singer-songwriter
Dawid Kownacki (born 1997), Polish professional football player
Sebastian Walukiewicz (born 2000), Polish professional football player

Twin towns – sister cities

Gorzów Wielkopolski is twinned with:

 Cava de' Tirreni, Italy
 Eberswalde, Germany
 Frankfurt an der Oder, Germany
 Herford (district), Germany

 Sumy, Ukraine
 Teramo, Italy

Gallery

Notes

References

External links

 
 
Jewish Community in Gorzów Wielkopolski on Virtual Shtetl

 
Cities and towns in Lubusz Voivodeship
City counties of Poland